Kasimovka (Qasim) is a rural locality (a village) in Kenger-Meneuzovsky Selsoviet, Bizhbulyaksky District, Bashkortostan, Russia. The population was 123 as of 2010. There is 1 street.

Geography 
Kasimovka is located 18 km northeast of Bizhbulyak (the district's administrative centre) by road. Kunakulovo is the nearest rural locality.

References 

Rural localities in Bizhbulyaksky District